Estádio Municipal Dr. Novelli Júnior, usually known as Estádio Novelli Júnior, is a multi-use stadium in Itu, Brazil. It is used mostly for football matches. The stadium has a maximum capacity of 18,000 people.

The Estádio Novelli Júnior is owned by the Itu City Hall. Ituano Futebol Clube usually plays its home matches at the stadium.

History
In 1947, the works on Estádio Novelli Júnior were completed. The inaugural match was played on May 25 of that year, when Ituano beat Amparo 6–1.

References

External links
Templos do Futebol
Ituano Futebol Clube Official Website

Football venues in São Paulo (state)
Ituano FC
Sports venues in São Paulo (state)